Serhat Caradee is an Australian filmmaker, writer and actor based in Sydney, New South Wales. He is known for feature films Cedar Boys (2009) and A Lion Returns (2020) and short films previously.

His films have screened at many local and international film festivals, and also been nominated for numerous awards and won four.

Early life and education
Born in Turkey, Caradee arrived in Australia when he was two and half years old, and grew up in the inner west Sydney suburbs of Newtown and Homebush. He played representative rugby league for Western Suburbs Juniors Harold Matthews Cup and Eastern Suburbs Juniors S.G. Ball Cup, rugby union and cricket at  Homebush Boys High, amateur boxing and martial arts achieving a Black Belt in Hap Ki Do before becoming interested in drama and acting on stage. He studied performing arts for five years in total at The Australian Playhouse Studio (TAPS), Western Sydney University (Theatre Nepean) and Actors Centre Australia then switched focus into theatre and film direction.

Caradee gained a Graduate Diploma of Arts (Film and Television) - Directing, from AFTRS (the Australian Film, Television and Radio School) in 2000 receiving the ADG (The Australian Directors Guild) Award with fellow student Cate Shortland upon graduation.

Career
As an actor, Caradee's credits include Australian TV series East West 101 and The Principal (2015), and the 2016 American sci-fi series Hunters for the Syfy Channel.
 
Caradee's influential role models have changed over the years, from Turkish director Yilmaz Güney, Oliver Stone and Elia Kazan early in his career, to with Krzysztof Kieslowski (Polish filmmaker) and Nuri Bilge Ceylan around 2020. He has also been inspired by human rights activists, sociologist's and writers Abby Martin, Susan Sontag, Gail Dines and Jane Elliott.

His first feature film, Cedar Boys, screened at several international film festivals in 2009 and earned award nominations in Australia, including an AACTA nomination for Best Original Screenplay and nominations for awards given by the Australian Writers Guild, Australian Directors Guild, and Inside Film. It won the Sydney Film Festival Audience Award.

A Lion Returns was shot in a record time for an Australian film, the 90 page script was shot over a total of 10 days. The story concerns a young Arab Muslim man returning from fighting for Islamic State in Syria to his family in Sydney, including his dying mother. It was released in 2020.

His upcoming film is based on  American author Michael Prescott's book Mark of Kane.

Bonafide Pictures

Caradee and producer Liz Burton are co-creators on a number of projects through their production company, Bonafide Pictures.

References

External links

Living people
Australian people of Turkish descent
Australian film directors
Year of birth missing (living people)
21st-century Australian male actors